Elaterinae is a subfamily of click beetles in the family Elateridae, containing 12 tribes worldwide.

Selected genera

References

Further reading

 
 
 

 
Elateridae